Hussein Nasser Walji (3 September 1920 – 17 December 2005) served as the president of Tanzania's Dar-as-Salaam Jamaat during the expansion of the community in the 1960s, and was involved in the establishment of Mehfil-e-Asgari. He was also a founding member of the Bilal Muslim Mission. Later, Hussein Nasser moved to Canada, and never returned to his native Tanzania.

Personal life
Little is known about Hussein Nasser's early life. His father died when he was young, so he worked in order to provide for his mother and younger brother. He married and had four daughters. He was in close association with many popular figures of his time, including Mulla Asghar, Sa'id Akhtar Rizvi, and Laurean Rugambwa.

Canada
Hussein Nasser settled in the town of Brampton, Ontario when he moved to Canada. He spent much of his later life reading and contemplating until his death in 2005.

1920 births
2005 deaths
Tanzanian Shia Muslims
Tanzanian emigrants to Canada